The Las Tetas de Cabra Formation is a geologic formation in Mexico. It preserves fossils dating back to the Wasatchian of the Early Eocene period.

Fossil content 
The following fossils have been reported from the formation:

Mammals 
Acreodi
 Dissacus sp.
 Wyolestes iglesius
Artiodactyls
 Diacodexis cf. gracilis
Cimolesta
 cf. Esthonyx sp.
Didelphimorphia
 Esteslestes ensis
Ferae
 cf. Oxyaena sp.
Glires
 ?Paramyidae indet.
Hyaenodonta
 Prolimnocyon sp.
Pantodonta
 Caenolambda jepseni
Perissodactyls
 Eohippus cf. angustidens
Placentalia
 Ectocion ignotum
 Meniscotherium chamense
 Phenacodus vortmani
 cf. Hyopsodus sp.
Theriiformes
 Ferae indet.

Reptiles 
 cf. Saniwa sp.
 Boidae indet.
 Iguanidae indet.

Amphibians 
 Caudata indet.

Fish 
 cf. Galeorhinus sp.

Invertebrates 
Gastropods
 Gastropoda indet.

Flora 
 Celtis sp.
 Chenopodiaceae indet.
 Heliantheae indet.
 Ulmaceae indet.

Wasatchian correlations

See also 
 List of fossiliferous stratigraphic units in Mexico

References

Bibliography 

 
 
 
 
 
 

Geologic formations of Mexico
Eocene Series of North America
Paleogene Mexico
Ypresian Stage
Wasatchian
Sandstone formations
Siltstone formations
Fluvial deposits
Lacustrine deposits
Paleontology in Mexico